Babbar Khalsa International (BKI), better known as Babbar Khalsa, is a Sikh terrorist organisation whose main objective is to create an independent Sikh country, Khalistan. It operates in Canada, Germany and the United Kingdom.

The organisation employs armed attacks to accomplish its goal and is officially banned and designated as an international terrorist organisation by the United States, Canada, the United Kingdom, the European Union, Japan, Malaysia, and India.

BKI was created in 1978 after clashes with the Nirankari sect of Sikhs. It was active throughout the 1980s in the Punjab insurgency and gained international notoriety in June 1985, for killing 329 civilians (mostly Canadians) in Air India Flight 182 in Canada's worst case of mass murder and for the associated 1985 Narita International Airport bombinga bungled attempt at mass murder on a second Air India flight on the same day. Its influence declined in the 1990s after several of its senior leaders were killed in encounters with Indian police.

Creation
The name Babbar Khalsa is taken from the Babbar Akali Movement of 1920, which fought against the British Rule of India. The modern-day Babbar Khalsa was created in 1978 by Jathedar Talwinder Singh Babbar and Jathedar Sukhdev Singh Babbar as an offshoot of Akhand Kirtani Jatha with the support of Bibi Amarjit Kaur. Talwinder Singh Babbar was the president of Babbar Khalsa International, with Sukhdev Singh Babbar as co-leader. After a bloody clash on 13 April 1978 between a group of Amritdhari Sikhs of Akhand Kirtani Jatha and a gathering of the rival Nirankari sect, BKI was created to exact revenge.

On 13 April 1978, the day to celebrate the birth of Khalsa, a peaceful Sant Nirankari convention was organized in Amritsar to start a new religion with the concept of panj pyarre as sath sitare, with permission from the Akali state government. The practices of the "Sant Nirankaris" sect of Nirankaris were considered heresy as the act was intentionally politically motivated to offend Sikh sentiments, but was opposed by Sikh orthodox leader Jarnail Singh Bhindranwale. From Golden Temple premises,  Bhindranwale delivered an angry sermon in which he declared that he would not allow this convention and would go there and cut them to pieces. A procession of about two hundred Sikhs led by Bhindranwale and Fauja Singh of the Akhand Kirtani Jatha left the Golden Temple, heading towards the Nirankari Convention. Fauja attempted to behead Nirankari chief Gurbachan Singh with his sword but was shot dead by Gurbachan's bodyguard, while Bhindranwale escaped. In the ensuing violence, several people were killed: two of Bhindranwale's followers, eleven members of the Akhand Kirtani Jatha and three Nirankaris. This event brought Bhindranwale to limelight in the media.

A criminal case was filed against sixty-two Nirankaris by the Akali-led government in Punjab. The case was heard in the neighbouring Haryana state, and all the accused were acquitted. The Punjab government Chief Minister Prakash Singh Badal decided not to appeal the decision. The case of Nirankaris received widespread support in the media.  Bhindranwale increased his rhetoric against the enemies of Sikhs. A letter of authority was issued by Akal Takht to ostracise the Sant Nirankaris. A sentiment was created to justify extrajudicial killings of the perceived enemies of Sikhism. The chief proponents of this attitude were Babbar Khalsa founded by Talwinder Singh Babbar and followers of the widow, Bibi Amarjit Kaur of the Akhand Kirtani Jatha, whose husband Fauja Singh had been at the head of the march in Amritsar; the Damdami Taksal led by Jarnail Singh Bhindranwale who had also been in Amritsar on the day of the outrage; the Dal Khalsa, formed with the object of demanding a sovereign Sikh state; and the All India Sikh Students Federation, which was banned by the government.

Babbar Khalsa started targeting people who sympathised with the Nirankaris. In the subsequent years following this event, several murders took place in Punjab and the surrounding areas allegedly by Bhindranwale's group and the new Babbar Khalsa. The Babbar Khalsa activists took up residence in the Golden Temple, where they would retreat to, after committing "acts of punishment" on people against the orthodox Sikh tenets. Police did not enter the temple complex to avoid hurting the sentiments of Sikhs. On 24 April 1980, the Nirankari head, Gurbachan was murdered. A member of the Akhand Kirtani Jatha, Ranjit Singh, surrendered and admitted to the assassination three years later, and was sentenced to serve thirteen years at the Tihar Jail in Delhi.

According to C. Christine Fair, Babbar Khalsa was opposed to Bhindranwale and more concerned with propagating sectarian violence and enforcing Sikh personal law than supporting Khalistan movement.

Financing
The group receives funds and support from its supporters within the Sikh community, that are largely located in Europe and North America. Historically, to get the financial and material support needed for operating terrorist activities, BKI has used in-person meetings, public rallies and fundraising events. Babbar organized  and featured at Sikh rallies and fundraisers across Canada. Babbar was instrumental in channeling financial support to BKI from overseas Sikh communities. BKI is sponsored by Germany-based extremist organisations with an aim to revive an armed conflict in the Indian Punjab.

Presence
BKI militants have their presence outside of India in Pakistan, North America, Europe and Scandinavia. BKI at present is active in the US, Canada, the UK, Belgium, France, Germany, Norway, Switzerland and Pakistan. BKI continues its operations from Pakistan with the support of Pakistan's Inter-Services Intelligence (ISI). According to Indian sources the group has its headquarters in Lahore, Pakistan.

In 1992, Talwinder Singh Babbar split from the BKI and formed the Babbar Khalsa (Babbar) faction. This happened after serious differences erupted between Babbar and BKI's leadership. The Babbar faction has a presence in the UK, Belgium, Germany and Switzerland.

Bans
It is officially banned and designated as an international terrorist organisation by several countries. 
Canada.
European Union
India
Japan
Malaysia
United Kingdom
United States

Activities
Babbar Khalsa kept up a low level of activity until 1983. Very few security personnel may have become members of Babbar Khalsa.

Some terrorists acts done in Canada, India and Germany have been claimed in the name of Babbar Khalsa. During his residence in Canada, Babbar continued to lead BKI activities. He was involved in terror financing, recruitment and radicalization of Sikh youths, procurement of small arms and explosives, and the development and coordination of terrorist attacks. After Operation Blue Star the organisation fell into disarray but was able to regroup and remained active.

1980s
On the morning of November 19, 1981, Police Inspector Pritam Singh Bajwa and Constable Surat Singh of Jalandhar were gunned down in Daheru village nearby Khanna in Ludhiana district. The militants, who were hiding in the house of Amarjit Singh Nihang, all managed to escape. This act gained Babbar Khalsa and its chief Talwinder Singh Babbar notoriety. Named in the first information report were Wadhawa Singh (current Babbar Khalsa chief, now residing in Pakistan), Talwinder Singh Babbar, Amarjit Singh Nihang, Amarjit Singh (Head Constable), Sewa Singh (Head Constable) and Gurnam Singh (Head Constable).

On June 23, 1985: BKI militants bombed Air India Flight 182 going from Montreal, Canada to New Delhi, India. An improvised explosive device placed inside the cargo hold of the Boeing 747 destroyed the plane with an explosion at an altitude of 31,000 feet in Irish airspace and it crashed into the Atlantic Ocean. All 329 passengers were killed, including 268 Canadian, 27 British and 24 Indian citizens. Babbar and Inderjit Singh Reyat were arrested by the Royal Canadian Mounted Police (RCMP) on explosive charges, linking the two to the Air India Flight 182 bombing and 1985 Narita International Airport bombing. Babbar was acquitted of all charges. Inderjit Singh Reyat admitted to building the bomb, was convicted in the Air India bombing. Reyat a member of the ISYF, was found guilty of manslaughter for making the bombs and had to spend more than 20 years in prison at Canada, and is the only individual convicted in these attacks as of 9 Feb 2009. The Commission of Inquiry into the Investigation of the Bombing of Air India Flight 182 concluded that, regarding Talwinder Singh Babbar, "[it] is now believed that he was the leader of the conspiracy to bomb Air India flights"

Five Babbar Khalsa members from Montreal were arrested May 30, 1986, for another plot to bomb Air India flights out of New York City. Newspaper editor Tara Singh Hayer was targeted with a bomb at his office in January 1986. Just weeks later, Sikhs from the Hamilton temple along with Air India bombing suspects Talwinder Singh Babbar and Ajaib Singh Bagri were arrested after being wiretapped discussing blowing up the Parliament and kidnapping children of MPs in India. Visiting Punjabi Cabinet Minister Malkiat Singh Sidhu was ambushed in Canada, surviving being shot in March 1986 by four gunmen.

1990s
On 8 January 1990, Khalistan Liberation Force in co-operation with Babbar Khalsa, killed DSP Gobind Ram in a bomb blast.

On 7 September 1991, eight Babbar Khalsa militants had an encounter with CRPF personnel near the village of Maujiya. On the militants' side, three were killed: Khem Singh Babbar, Paramjeet Singh Babbar and Gurmail Singh Babbar. The encounter lasted for 24 hours.

On 31 August 1995, Dilawar Singh Babbar assassinated Punjab Chief Minister Beant Singh in a suicide bomb attack at the civil secretariat in Chandigarh. Dilawar claimed allegiance to the Babbar Khalsa and four other members of the Babbar Khalsa were named responsible for the killing of Beant Singh.

2000s
In 2007, Babbar Khalsa militants were arrested by the Punjab police for a bombing at the Shingar Cinema Complex in Ludhiana on 14 October 2007, in which 6 people were killed and 37 wounded. The police also recovered 2 pistols, 5.10 kg of RDX and 3 detonators from them. The militants had gone to Pakistan with a Sikh Jatha for pilgrimage, where they received the training for making bombs. The group received explosive devices from Pakistan across the international border in Bikaner, Rajasthan.

2010s
Four Babbar Khalsa International UK members were arrested and later bailed in July 2010 in connection with the murder of a Sikh leader in Punjab, India.

In March 2017, Balwinder Singh, the head of Babbar Khalsa's operations in the United States, was sentenced to 15 years in prison by Nevada U.S. district judge for conspiracy to launch a terrorist attack in India in 2013. Singh pleaded guilty to providing funding and materials to a co-conspirator, who was to travel to India to assassinate or maim an Indian government official. The target government official was to be determined upon the co-conspirator's arrival.

Decline
The crackdown on Sikh militant organisations by the Indian Government in the early 1990s, followed by government infiltration of the Khalistan movement and the various militant organisations respectively, greatly weakened the Babbar Khalsa, ultimately leading to the death of Sukhdev Singh Babbar (9 August 1992) and Talwinder Singh Babbar (15 October 1992). Babbar had been killed by Indian police in a gunfight per the official sources.

Despite setbacks incurred in the early nineties, Babbar Khalsa is still active underground, although not to the extent it once was. Current leadership resides with Wadhawa Singh Babbar.

See also
 Jagtar Singh Hawara
 Kharku

References

Sikh politics
Organisations designated as terrorist by the European Union
Organizations designated as terrorist by Canada
Organisations designated as terrorist by India
Organisations designated as terrorist by the United Kingdom
Organizations based in Asia designated as terrorist
Sikh terrorism
Rebel groups in India
Designated terrorist organizations associated with Sikhism
Organisations designated as terrorist by Japan
Insurgency in Punjab
Organizations designated as terrorist by Malaysia
1978 establishments in Punjab, India
Organizations established in 1978
Air India Flight 182
Organizations designated as terrorist by the United States
Pro-Khalistan militant outfits